Alina Rosenberg (born 29 April 1992) is a German Paralympic equestrian.

Rosenberg has Spastic diplegia, a type of Cerebral palsy. She won a silver medal at the 2016 Paralympic Games in the team event alongside Carolin Schnarre, Elke Philipp and Steffen Zeibig.

References

External links
 
 
 

1992 births
Living people
German dressage riders
German female equestrians
Paralympic equestrians of Germany
Paralympic silver medalists for Germany
Paralympic medalists in equestrian
Equestrians at the 2016 Summer Paralympics
Medalists at the 2016 Summer Paralympics
Sportspeople with cerebral palsy
People from Konstanz
Sportspeople from Freiburg (region)